USS Wild Goose (SP-562) was a United States Navy patrol vessel in commission from 1917 to 1920.

Wild Goose was built as a wooden-hulled civilian screw steamer of the same name by the Gas Engine and Power Company and Charles L. Seabury Company at Morris Heights in the Bronx, New York, in 1913 to a design by Charles L. Seabury.  On 21 April 1917, the U.S. Navy took delivery of her from her owner, Charles L. Harding of Boston, Massachusetts, for use as a section patrol craft during World War I. After fitting out for naval use, she was commissioned as USS Wild Goose (SP-562) on 25 June 1917.

Assigned to the 1st Naval District, Wild Goose carried out patrol duties in northern New England until transferred to the 5th Naval District in the Hampton Roads, Virginia, area at an unrecorded date. She is known to have been operating in the 5th Naval District in November 1918.

The Navy retained Wild Goose after the end of World War I. She is known to have been stationed at the Washington Navy Yard in Washington, D.C. as of 1 October 1919. On 21 June 1920, the Navy loaned her to the City of Norfolk, Virginia, which later returned her to the Navy.

The Navy placed Wild Goose on the sale list on 24 August 1920. She was sold on 17 November 1920.

Wild Goose should not be confused with another section patrol vessel, which was in commission at the same time.

References

SP-562 Wild Goose at Department of the Navy Naval History and Heritage Command Online Library of Selected Images: U.S. Navy Ships -- Listed by Hull Number "SP" #s and "ID" #s -- World War I Era Patrol Vessels and other Acquired Ships and Craft numbered from SP-500 through SP-599
NavSource Online: Section Patrol Craft Photo Archive: Wild Goose (SP 562)

Patrol vessels of the United States Navy
World War I patrol vessels of the United States
Ships built in Morris Heights, Bronx
1913 ships